Stefan Bałuk (15 January 191429 January 2014) was a Polish general and photographer.

World War II

Born on 15 January 1914, Bałuk was a law student at the University of Warsaw at the onset of World War II.  After joining the Home Army, Bałuk fought in the Invasion of Poland, and then transferred to the 10th Motorized Cavalry Brigade.  Bałuk received parachute commando training in Glasgow before being dropped back into Poland in April 1944 as Cichociemni.  Bałuk "engaged in the production of false documents for Polish intelligence officers, made photo documentation of German military installations in Warsaw and took part in the Warsaw Uprising."  After his release from Nazi prisoner-of-war camp Oflag II-D in Großborn, Bałuk traveled to his mother's and sister's home in Praga; he found their house destroyed, but with a note saying they had fled to safety.

During his World War II service, Bałuk was promoted to the (21st-century equivalent) rank of generał brygady and awarded both the Virtuti Militari and the Armia Krajowa Cross.

Post-war
After the war, Bałuk Was imprisoned by the Soviet Union from November 1945 to March 1947.  He later worked as a taxicab driver and took up photography as a hobby—publishing several photo albums.  In 2008, Bałuk published his memoirs: Byłem Cichociemnym (released in English as Silent and Unseen: I Was a WWII Special Ops Commando).  Bałuk died on 29 January 2014.  He was posthumously awarded the Grand Cross of the Order of Polonia Restituta by Polish President Bronisław Komorowski, and later buried in Powązki Military Cemetery.

References

External links
 

1914 births
2014 deaths
20th-century photographers
21st-century photographers
burials at Powązki Military Cemetery
Cichociemni
Grand Crosses of the Order of Polonia Restituta
Home Army officers
men centenarians
military personnel from Warsaw
photographers from Warsaw
Polish centenarians
Polish generals
Polish military personnel of World War II
Polish prisoners of war
Polish September Campaign participants
recipients of the Armia Krajowa Cross
recipients of the Virtuti Militari (1943–1989)
taxi drivers
Warsaw Uprising insurgents
World War II prisoners of war held by the Soviet Union